LaVita Raynor, known simply as Vita, is an American rapper, songwriter and actress. Raynor is perhaps best known for her role as Kionna, Tommy "Buns" Bundy's (portrayed by DMX) "mistress" in the 1998 crime drama film Belly. As a rapper, Raynor is known for her appearances on the songs "Lapdance" by N.E.R.D, "Put It on Me" by Ja Rule, and "Down 4 U" by Irv Gotti. In 2014, Raynor was included in Billboards list of the "31 Female Rappers Who Changed Hip-Hop".

Biography

Career
Raynor had a minor role in the 1998 crime drama film Belly as 16-year-old girl Kionna (who is one of Tommy "Buns" Bundy's girlfriends). In the same year, Raynor also appeared in the video of the song "Break Ups 2 Make Ups" by Method Man and D'Angelo, playing the former's girlfriend. By 2000, Raynor was signed to Irv Gotti's Murder Inc. In 2001, Raynor appeared on the hook of “The Learning (Burn),” the first single released from the Mobb Deep album Infamy. Raynor contributed vocals and appeared in the official music video for the remix to Ja Rule's "Holla Holla", and made a cameo appearance in the video for Ja Rule's "6 Feet Underground". In 2002, Raynor contributed to the Irv Gotti-produced hit single Down 4 U with Ja Rule, Ashanti, and Charli Baltimore from the Murder Inc. compilation album Irv Gotti Presents: The Inc.. The song was another hit for Vita, peaking within the top ten on the Billboard Hot 100.  Vita also appeared on the compilation album on the song Here We Come.

In July 2002, Vita parted ways with Irv Gotti and Murder Inc. Consequently, Vita's debut album on Murder Inc., La Dolce Vita, which was originally scheduled to be released in Fall 2002, was ultimately shelved. With the first single "Justify My Love" not gaining attention. Madonna shut her down from making her re-make original, as she recorded a version with her rapping, but Madonna did not clear the version with the rap. Her debut album was later released on DatPiff. Raynor made a comeback in 2012 with the mixtape, Pre-cumm, a title given for "pure shock value"; she has also worked on producing a lingerie line. In 2017, Raynor released different songs and videos together with European rapper CHG Unfadable.

Personal life
Raynor is the younger sister of singer Kima Raynor.

Discography

Mixtapes

Filmography

References

External links 
 Vita at MySpace
 

Living people
African-American women rappers
American women rappers
American actresses
21st-century American rappers
21st-century American women musicians
Year of birth missing (living people)
21st-century African-American women
21st-century African-American musicians
21st-century women rappers